Road FC has many Korean fighters of note, and an international roster of fighters from Japan, Brazil, China, USA and more. In 2015, it signed former UFC fighter and TUF China veteran Lipeng Zhang to a multi-fight contract.

Champions

Current champions 

  Mighty Mo (openweight champion)
  Jung Hwan Cha (middleweight champion)
  Young Choi (middleweight interim champion)
  A Sol Kwon (lightweight champion)
  Mu Gyeom Choi (featherweight champion)
  Min Jong Song (flyweight champion)
  Seo Hee Ham (women's atomweight champion)

Former champions 

  Riki Fukuda (former middleweight champion)
  Eun Soo Lee (former middleweight champion)
  Shungo Oyama (former middleweight champion)
  Yui Chul Nam (former lightweight champion)
  Soo Chul Kim (former bantamweight champion)
  Yoon Jun Lee (former bantamweight champion)
  Kil Woo Lee (former bantamweight champion)
  Kyung Ho Kang (former bantamweight champion)
  Nam Jin Jo (former flyweight champion)

South Korea 

  Dong Sik Yoon
  Mu Bae Choi
  Hong Man Choi
  Tae Hyun Bang

Japan 

  Daiju Takase
  Emi Fujino
  Takasuke Kume
  Issei Tamura
  Ikuhisa Minowa
  Kazuyuki Fujita
  Michihiro Omigawa
  Satoko Shinashi
  Yusuke Kawaguchi
  Takafumi Otsuka
  Ryo Kawamura
  Takayo Hashi
  Mikihito Yamagami

China 

  Jumabieke Tuerxun
  Lipeng Zhang

Brazil 
  Andrews Nakahara
  Gabi Garcia
  Marcos Vinicius
  Marlon Sandro
  Roan Carneiro
  Luis Ramos

United States 
  George Roop
  Jeff Monson
  Jinh Yu Frey
  Marcus Brimage

Netherlands 
  Gilbert Yvel
  Melvin Manhoef

Other countries 
  Denis Kang
  Jérôme Le Banner
  Alexandru Lungu
  Joachim Hansen
  Shamil Zavurov
  Vuyisile Colossa
  Sokoudjou

See also 
List of Road FC champions
List of Road FC events
List of current Road FC fighters
List of current Bellator fighters
List of current Invicta FC fighters
List of current Rizin FF fighters
List of current ONE fighters
List of current UFC fighters
List of current WSOF fighters
List of current WSOF-Global fighters

References

External links
List of Road FC fighters roadfc.co.kr

Road Fighting Championship